Civic Center or Citizens' Center is a government building in Shenzhen, China. It is located within the Futian Central Business District and was constructed at a cost of CNY 2.172 billion. The civic building was the centerpiece plan for the Shenzhen Futian Central District Master Plan and based in traditional Chinese layout aesthetic of a central axis, which stretched 2km from Lianhua Mountain in the north, through the Civic Center, and to the Exhibition Center in the south.

Development 

The Civic Center building and area master plan  was designed by the American firm Lee/Timchula Architects, which won the international design competition in 1996. The roc-wing design of the Civic Center was the first iconic building in the new city center, and the final building was considerably different from the original plans. The long roof truss was built in 1998, but wasn't clad until 2004 due to a lack of funding. The building's roof spans 486 meters and has a width of 154 meters.

See also
 Civic Center Station, the Shenzhen Metro station serving the building and its surroundings
 Shenzhen Museum, part of which is located within the building

References

Tourist attractions in Shenzhen
Futian District